The 1994–95 Kent Football League season was the 29th in the history of the Kent Football League, a football competition in England.

The league was won by Sheppey United for the fourth time.

League table

The league featured 20 clubs which competed in the previous season, along with one new club:
Canterbury City, resigned from the Southern League

League table

References

External links

1994-95
1994–95 in English football leagues